Alexandru Dragomir (November 8, 1916 in Zalău – November 13, 2002 in Bucharest) was a Romanian philosopher. He made his doctoral studies under Martin Heidegger's direction, in 1940.

Philosophy
Dragomir refused to publish any of his writing. He always maintained that publishing was of no importance to him; instead, genuine understanding was all that mattered. Thus he never got involved with the public cultural milieu. Before his death, no one even knew whether he had actually written anything, or not.

Walter Biemel recollects that Heidegger much appreciated Dragomir's brightness. Dragomir attended Heidegger's private seminars and it is said that, when the discussion seemed to stall, Heidegger would turn to him and say: “Eh, what do the Latins say? ”. Dragomir was a close friend of Biemel, with whom he translated “What is metaphysics? ” into Romanian (in 1942).

At the end of 1943, Dragomir was obliged to leave Freiburg im Breisgau and Heidegger's seminars and return to Romania to be conscripted. It was the beginning of war. Even Heidegger's insistence to prolong his stay in Freiburg could not prevent his departure. In 1945, the end of the war coincided with the Russian occupation and the introduction of communism in Romania; Dragomir saw himself unable to continue his thesis with Heidegger. He understood that his connections with Germany could be reasons for political persecution and that his interest in philosophy could trigger his prosecution. Dragomir understood that his life depended on his ability to hide his interest in philosophy and to efface his ties with Germany. While continuously erasing the traces of his past, Dragomir worked in all possible trades: welder, salesman, civil servant or accountant, always changing jobs, being regularly fired because of his politically unsuitable “file”. Finally, he was an economist with the Ministry for Wood until his retirement in 1976. After 1985, he agreed to make a compromise as far as his silence on his philosophical activity: he decided to hold several seminars with the disciples of Noica: Gabriel Liiceanu, Andrei Pleșu, Sorin Vieru.

Legacy
In 2002, a hundred books with notes, comments on traditional philosophical texts, tests of investigation and phenomenologic analysis, philosophical and extremely subtle descriptions were found at his home. Most of the texts are phenomenologic microanalyses of various concrete aspects of life. Texts were found that dealt with themes such as the mirror, lapse of memory, error, [...], the morning alarm clock, what one calls ugly and disgusting, attention - because of being wrong about oneself, writing and orality - because of distinguishing and [...], uniqueness and so on. They are disparate and heterogeneous subjects, as if Dragomir had let his phenomenologic magnifier fall upon the diversity of the world and chose to analyze, for his own desire to comprehend, with no other end, such and such fact or such and such aspect of reality.

However, one of his topics is constant: it is to be found in a series of books, entitled Chronos, in which Dragomir systematically looked into the problem of time for several decades: the first book goes back to 1948 and it includes several notes written in German, while the last one covers the period between 1980 and 1990. This discovery enabled the recovery of Dragomir's work. Three volumes have been already published by the Humanitas publishing house to-date: Crase banalităţi metafizice ("Utter metaphysical banalities", 2004), Cinci plecări din prezent. Exerciţii fenomenologice ("Five departures from present. Phenomenological exercises", 2005), and Caietele timpului ("The Time Notebooks", 2006). Five more volumes are envisaged for publication. Lastly, to prevent any further delay in the reception of this thinker abroad, a number of the Studia Phænomenologica magazine was dedicated to him, featuring texts by Dragomir translated into French, English and German, as well as texts about his personality, according to the ones who knew him and who could testify for his life and his manner of philosophizing. Other translations appeared in the French review “Alter”.

References

Sources
 Paul Balogh & Cristian Ciocan (eds.), The Ocean of Forgetting. Alexandru Dragomir: A Romanian Phenomenologist Studia Phaenomenologica IV (2004) 3-4
 Lansarea primei cărți despre Alexandru Dragomir, scrisă de Isabela Vasiliu-Scraba
 Isabela Vasiliu-Scraba, Figuri ale filozofiei românești: Al. Dragomir și Octavian Vuia
 Isabela Vasiliu Scraba, Al. Dragomir nu este o „invenţie” a lui Liiceanu, fiindcă oamenii mici nu-i pot inventa pe oamenii mari

External links

 Isabela Vasiliu-Scraba, Propedeutică la eternitate. Alexandru Dragomir în singurătarea gândului, Slobozia, 2004
 Isabela Vasiliu-Scraba, Alexandru Dragomir nu este o „invenție” a lui Liiceanu, fiindcă oamenii mici nu-i pot inventa pe oamenii mari.

People from Zalău
1916 births
2002 deaths
20th-century Romanian philosophers